Alexander Bannink (born 20 February 1990) is a Dutch professional footballer who plays as a midfielder for German club Gütersloh.

Club career
Bannink formerly played for FC Twente, Heracles, FC Zwolle and FC Emmen.

He joined De Graafschap in summer 2015.

He joined Go Ahead Eagles after spending two years with FC Emmen.

Honours

Club
Twente
Johan Cruijff Schaal: 2010

References

External links
 
 Voetbal International profile 
 

1990 births
Living people
People from Oldenzaal
Footballers from Overijssel
Association football midfielders
Dutch footballers
Quick '20 players
FC Twente players
Heracles Almelo players
PEC Zwolle players
FC Emmen players
De Graafschap players
Go Ahead Eagles players
HSC '21 players
FC Gütersloh 2000 players
Eredivisie players
Eerste Divisie players
Derde Divisie players
Oberliga (football) players
Dutch expatriate footballers
Expatriate footballers in Germany
Dutch expatriate sportspeople in Germany